Blackwell is a city in Coke and Nolan Counties in the U.S. state of Texas. Its population was 311 at the 2010 census.

Geography

Blackwell is located at  (32.085516, –100.319605).

Demographics

2020 census

As of the 2020 United States census, 258 people, 92 households, and 55 families resided in the city.

2000 census
As of the census of 2000, 360 people, 153 households, and 106 families resided in the city. The population density was 602.4 people per square mile (231.7/km2). The 180 housing units  averaged 301.2 per square mile (115.8/km2). The racial makeup of the city was 90.56% White, 0.28% African American, 0.28% Native American, 7.78% from other races, and 1.11% from two or more races. Hispanics or Latinos of any race were 11.11% of the population.

Of 153 households, 32.7% had children under 18 living with them, 53.6% were married couples living together, 11.8% had a female householder with no husband present, and 30.1% were not families. About 28.1% of all households were made up of individuals, and 14.4% had someone living alone who was 65 or older. The average household size was 2.35, and the average family size was 2.83.

In the city, the population was distributed as 26.9% under 18, 6.4% from 18 to 24, 25.3% from 25 to 44, 18.6% from 45 to 64, and 22.8% who were 65 or older. The median age was 40 years. For every 100 females, there were 91.5 males. For every 100 females 18 and over, there were 89.2 males.

The median income for a household in the city was $29,659, and for a family was $33,250. Males had a median income of $30,000 versus $19,861 for females. The per capita income for the city was $14,686. About 6.7% of families and 11.2% of the population were below the poverty line, including 20.4% of those under age 18 and none of those age 65 or over.

Education
Blackwell is served by the Blackwell Consolidated Independent School District.

References

Cities in Coke County, Texas
Cities in Nolan County, Texas
Cities in Texas